Sekarabad (also Romanized as Sekarābād and Sokrābād; also known as Sagliawa, Seglyava, and Soklāveh) is a village in Sanjabad-e Jonubi Rural District, Firuz District, Kowsar County, Ardabil Province, Iran. At the 2006 census, its population was 144, in 26 families.

References 

Tageo

Towns and villages in Kowsar County